Matthew Joseph Cody (28 February 1895 – 10 January 1974) was  a former Australian rules footballer who played with Collingwood in the Victorian Football League (VFL).

Notes

External links 

Matt Cody's profile at Collingwood Forever

1895 births
1974 deaths
Australian rules footballers from Victoria (Australia)
Collingwood Football Club players
Kew Football Club players